Montana Jordan (born March 8, 2003) is an American actor. He is best known for his role as Georgie Cooper in Young Sheldon.

Life and career
Born in Longview, Texas, he was raised in Ore City, Texas.

In October 2015, he was cast in his first role, being selected from 10,000 applicants for the role of Jaden in the Jody Hill-directed film The Legacy of a Whitetail Deer Hunter, in which Josh Brolin plays his father and Danny McBride plays a friend.; it was released in March 2018. it was released in March 2018.  

In March 2017, Jordan was cast as Sheldon Cooper's older brother George "Georgie" Cooper, Jr. in The Big Bang Theory spin-off Young Sheldon. He was nominated for Best Performance in a TV Series – Supporting Teen Actor at the 39th Young Artist Awards, which went to Dylan Duff of Teens 101.

Filmography

Awards and nominations

References

External links
 
  
Montana Jordan on CBS.com
 Montana Jordan Mother - Kelli Pieratt Smith

2003 births
Living people
21st-century American male actors
American male television actors
Male actors from Texas
People from Longview, Texas
People from Upshur County, Texas
American male child actors